Gavilan Peak is northwest of Daisy Mountain, north of Anthem, Arizona and southeast of New River, Arizona. Considering its steepness, it is climbed much less frequently than Daisy Mountain. It was named in the 1880s, when the U.S. Cavalry and the Apaches fought a battle in the area. The name means 'sparrow hawk' in Spanish and 'hawk' in Apache.

References

Landforms of Maricopa County, Arizona
Mountains of Arizona
Mountains of Maricopa County, Arizona